Culicoides obsoletus the name of a species (and a species group) of midges in the subgenus Avaritia.  According to a molecular phylogeny, Avaritia is monophyletic, and Culicoides obsoletus, Culicoides scoticus and Culicoides chiopterus should be part of the Obsoletus complex whereas Culicoides dewulfi should be excluded from it.

The species group covers five closely related species:
 Culicoides chiopterus
 Culicoides dewulfi
 Culicoides scoticus
 Culicoides obsoletus
 Culicoides montanus

Sometimes, a reference can be made to the Obsoletus complex. This complex consists of three species, namely:
 Culicoides obsoletus
 Culicoides scoticus
 Culicoides montanus

If reference is made only to Culicoides obsoletus s.str., it means only
 Culicoides obsoletus

Culicoides obsoletus is thought to be the main vector of the BTV8 outbreak in Northern Europe.

References

Culicoides